is a former Japanese football player and manager. He is currently the manager of Oita Trinita.

Playing career
Shimotaira was born in Gonohe, Aomori on December 18, 1971. After graduating from high school, he joined Japan Soccer League club Hitachi (later Kashiwa Reysol) in 1990. He became a regular player as defensive midfielder from 1991. In 1992, Japan Soccer League was folded and the club joined new league Japan Football League. In 1995, the club was promoted to J1 League. In 1999, the club won the champions J.League Cup. Although he played as regular player for a long time, he moved to FC Tokyo in 2001. Although he could not become a regular player behind Satoru Asari and Fumitake Miura in 2001, he played as regular player instead Asari and Miura in 2002 because they were injured. In 2003, he returned to Kashiwa Reysol. He retired end of 2004 season.

Coaching career
After retirement, Shimotaira started coaching career at Kashiwa Reysol in 2005. He mainly served as scout and manager for youth team until 2015. In 2016, he became a manager for top team under manager Milton Mendes. In March 2016, Mendes was sacked and Shimotaira became a new manager as Mendes successor. Although the club finished at 8th place in 2016, the club won the 4th place in 2017 and won the qualify for 2018 AFC Champions League. However the club results were bad in 2018 and he was sacked in May when the club was at the 14th place of 18 clubs.

In 2019, Shimotaira signed with J2 League club, Yokohama FC and became a coach under manager Edson Tavares. In May, Tavares was sacked and Shimotaira became a new manager.

In 1 February 2022, Shimotaira signed with J2 League relegated club, Oita Trinita and became a manager.

The final position 5th advance to promotion playoff J1 League. They draw 2-2 with Roasso Kumamoto in away game and missed J1 League return in one year.

Club statistics

Managerial statistics
Update; end of 2022 season.

References

External links
 
 
 Takahiro Shimotaira at Footballdatabase

1971 births
Living people
Association football people from Aomori Prefecture
Japanese footballers
Japan Soccer League players
J1 League players
Japan Football League (1992–1998) players
Kashiwa Reysol players
FC Tokyo players
Japanese football managers
J1 League managers
J2 League managers
Kashiwa Reysol managers
Yokohama FC managers
Oita Trinita managers
Association football midfielders